Jean-Louis Billon (born 8 December 1964) is an Ivorian politician. He’s an actor of the political and economic life of Côte d'Ivoire, former Minister of Commerce. He is married to Henriette Gomis since 1994.

Early life and education 

Billon spent his childhood between Abidjan and Dabakala, the birthplace of his father (Pierre Billon). He obtained a Master in Business Law at the University of Montpellier and a degree from the Institute of Higher National Defence Studies.

He got his masters in International Business Management at the University of Florida. He began his career in Wisconsin, as sales manager of Grace Cocoa.

In 2001, he took the head of the family business and became mayor of Dabakala, a position he held until his appointment to the chair of the Regional Council of Hambol in 2013.

Economic involvement 

Jean-Louis Billon was named socioeconomic adviser in 2001, Vice-President of the WAEMU Regional Chamber in 2002 and Vice President for West Africa of the Permanent Conference of African and Francophone Consular Chambers in 2004.

That same year, he participated with some members of the Ivorian civil society (CSCI) to the development of scenarios, in order to help the country to emerge from the crisis. Indeed, he launched a campaign across Europe and emerging countries, for example with a meeting at the MEDEF in Paris on 26 May 2008, where he was asking for the return of French investors in Ivory Coast.

In 2009 he became Chairman of the Board of Directors of UBA Bank.

Political career 

Appointed Minister of Trade, Crafts and SME on 22 November 2012, by President Alassane Ouattara, Jean-Louis Billon is currently Minister of Trade of Ivory Coast.

During his first term, he has defined an institutional and regulatory framework for the activities of crafts and SMEs, to improve their creation and development. On this purpose, he is the creator of the Phoenix Project, in an ongoing wish to enhance African companies.

Various other actions took place during Jean-Louis Billon’s term. Among them, the rehabilitation of Artisanal Centre of Grand-Bassam, the creation of the first Ivorian Market Handicrafts (MIVA), or the launch of the project "The Agency" for SMEs, including the establishment of a guarantee fund and business incubators.

In October 2021, Jean-Louis Billon announced his candidacy for the presidential election scheduled for 2025.

Sporting commitment 

In addition to his socio-economic and political engagement, Jean-Louis Billon is attached to the sport culture of his country. On 13 December 2007, he became head of the National Committee of Support for Elephants, which he resigned 27 June 2010 after the World campaign in South Africa.

References

External links

Official site

Rally of the Republicans politicians
Living people
1964 births
People from Vallée du Bandama District
Mayors of places in Ivory Coast
Trade ministers of Ivory Coast
People from Abidjan